Fhána (stylized as fhána) is a three-member Japanese pop band that formed in 2012 as an indie band. After releasing one album independently, they were signed in 2013 to Lantis. They released their debut single "Que Sera Sera" in August 2013.

History
Fhána originally formed with Jun'ichi Satō, Yuxuki Waga, and Kevin Mitsunaga, all three having previously been involved in separate independent bands. Fhána did not have a fixed vocalist at first, instead employing guest vocalists to sing the band's songs. Fhána released their independent album New World Line on May 18, 2012 featuring four guest vocalists: Makiko Naka, Towana, IA (a Vocaloid sampling Lia's voice), and Aoi Tada. In late 2012, Towana joined Fhána as the official vocalist. Fhána was signed to Lantis in 2013 and released their major debut single  on August 21, 2013; the song is used as the ending theme to the 2013 anime series The Eccentric Family.

The band's second single "Tiny Lamp" was released on November 23, 2013; the song is used as the opening theme to the 2013 anime series Gingitsune. Their third single "Divine Intervention" was released on January 22, 2014; the song is used as the opening theme to the 2014 anime series Witch Craft Works. Fhána's fourth single  was released on April 30, 2014; the song is used as the opening theme to the 2014 anime series The Kawai Complex Guide to Manors and Hostel Behavior. Fhána released an updated version of their New World Line album titled View from New World Line on May 28, 2014 via iTunes. The band's fifth single  was released on November 5, 2014; the song is used as the ending theme to the 2014 anime series Celestial Method. Fhána's major debut album Outside of Melancholy was released on February 4, 2015.

Fhána's sixth single  was released on August 5, 2015; the song is used as the opening theme to the 2015 anime series Fate/kaleid liner Prisma Illya 2wei Herz!. Fhána's seventh single  was released on October 28, 2015; the song is used as the opening theme to the 2015 anime series Comet Lucifer. Fhána's eighth single  was released on January 27, 2016; the song is used as the opening theme to the 2016 anime series Haruchika. Fhána's second studio album What a Wonderful World Line was released on April 27, 2016.

Fhána's ninth single "Calling" was released on August 3, 2016; the song is used as the ending theme song to the 2016 anime series Tales of Zestiria the X. The band's tenth single  was released on January 25, 2017; the song is used as the opening theme to the 2017 anime series Miss Kobayashi's Dragon Maid. Fhána's 11th single  was released on April 26, 2017; the song is used as the ending theme to the second season of The Eccentric Family. Their 12th single "Hello! My World!!" was released on August 2, 2017; the song is used as the opening theme to the 2017 anime series Knight's & Magic. The band's 13th single  was released on January 31, 2018; the song is used as the opening theme to the 2018 anime series Märchen Mädchen. Fhána's third studio album World Atlas was released on March 28, 2018. 

Their 14th single  was released on August 7, 2019, and their 15th single  was released on February 26, 2020. Fhána subsequently released three digital singles: "Pathos" on December 18, 2020, "Ethos" on March 12, 2021, and "Nameless Color" on April 9, 2021. "Nameless Color" is featured in Square Enix's rhythm game Show By Rock!! Fes A Live. Fhána's 19th single  was released on July 7, 2021; the title song is used as the opening theme to the 2021 anime series Miss Kobayashi's Dragon Maid S.

In December 2022, Yuxuki decided to leave the band and his last concert was the final concert of the "Fhána Cipher Live Tour 2022" in Nagoya.

Members

Current members
 – keyboards, backing vocals
Kevin Mitsunaga – sampler, metallophone, synthesizers, backing vocals
Towana – vocals

Former members
Yuxuki Waga – guitar

Discography

Albums

Studio albums

Compilation albums

Singles

Digital singles

Music videos

Other album appearances

References

External links

 

Japanese pop music groups
Lantis (company) artists
Musical groups established in 2012
2012 establishments in Japan